Corraville is an unincorporated community in Prince Edward Island, Canada. The community is in Kings County in the eastern part of the Province, SW. of St. Peters.

References 

Communities in Kings County, Prince Edward Island